The Hungarian Air Force, is the air force branch of the Hungarian Defence Forces.

The task of the current Hungarian Air Force is primarily defensive purposes. The flying units of the air force are organised into a single command; under the Air Command and Control Centre.

History

1918 to pre–World War II 
Following the dissolution of the Austro-Hungarian Monarchy in 1918, a small air arm was established operating surviving aircraft from Hungarian factories and training schools. This air arm became the Hungarian Red Air Force under the short-lived Hungarian Soviet Republic, but was disbanded upon its downfall.

World War II 
Under the Treaty of Trianon (1920), Hungary was forbidden from owning military aircraft. However, a secret air arm was gradually established under the cover of civilian flying clubs. During 1938, as a result of the Bled agreement, the existence of the Royal Hungarian Air Force, was made known. The army's aviation service was reorganized and expanded.

Late 1938 the army aviation was once again reorganized. Admiral Horthy, the head of state, ordered that the army aviation should become an independent service effective 9 January 1939. Colonel Ferenc Feketehalmi Czeydner became the Air Section Chief in the Honvéd Ministry; Major General Waldemar Kenese became Inspector of the Air Force; Colonel Ferenc Szentnémedy became Chief-of-Staff, and Colonel László Háry was appointed head of the Magyar Királyi Honvéd Légierő (MKHL).

It subsequently participated in clashes with the newly established Slovak Republic and in the border confrontation with the Kingdom of Romania. In April 1941, operations were conducted in support of the German invasion of Yugoslavia and, on 27 June 1941, Hungary declared war on the Soviet Union.
In 1940, the decision was made to unite the Air Force, the anti-aircraft forces, and the civilian air defense organizations under one central headquarters. Colonel László Háry was retired 24 December 1940, and on 1 March 1941 the new organization was constituted. General András Littay became Air Sub-Department Chief, and Colonel Géza Vörös was appointed Head of the Air General Staff. On 1 June 1941, the Air Defense Corps was established, and Lieutenant General Béla Rákosi became Commander of Army Aviation. In effect the Air Force had once again become part of the Army. In the summer of 1942, an air brigade was attached to the Luftwaffe's VIII. Fliegerkorps on the Eastern Front. Beginning March 1944, Allied bomber raids began on Hungary and progressively increased in intensity. The 101st "Puma" fighter group (later wing) was the elite unit of the MKHL (its name and insignia are carried on by the "Puma" fighter squadron of the Hungarian Air Force of today). Late in 1944 all efforts were redirected towards countering the advancing Red Army, but to no avail. All fighting in Hungary ended on 16 April 1945.

Post–World War II to present 
A small air arm was organised along Soviet lines during 1947. Following the communist takeover, Russian military aid was stepped up and a major expansion program initiated. By 1956 the Hungarian Air Force consisted of the 25th Fighter Division (25. Vadászrepülő Hadosztály, HQ in Taszár), the 66th Fighter Division (66. Vadaszrepülő Hadosztály, HQ in Kecskemét), the 82nd Separate Bomber Division (82. Önálló Bombázó Hadosztály, HQ in Kunmadaras), the 28th Ground Attack Division (28. Csatarepülő Hadosztály, HQ in Székesfehérvár) and a training air division. When Soviet forces invaded to suppress the Hungarian Revolution of 1956, sections of the Hungarian Air Force attacked Soviet forces and resisted Russian attempts to occupy their bases. The resistance was short-lived and the entire Hungarian air force was demobilized soon after. A reconstituted air arm was reformed in the following year as part of the Hungarian People's Army, but initially only as an internal security force. The remaining Hungarian air force assets were organised in the Aircraft Training Center (Repülő Kiképző Központ (RKK)) on April 1, 1957, with one mixed aircraft types squadron each at the main fighter air bases at Pápa, Taszár and Kecskemét. Gradually, starting in 1959 as Hungary became stable, the air force was expanded again, but it remained an integral part of the army and was essentially a defensive force.

During the Cold War period communist Hungary had numerous SA-2, SA-3 and also SA-5 (one unit) batteries and a large number of radar installations, mostly tasked with defending the Danube line against NATO air strikes. Army air defense was equipped with the SA-4, SA-6 Kub and SA-9, SA-13 systems besides conventional AAA units.

The Hungarian People's Army Air Force operated the Il-28, MiG-15, MiG-17, MiG-19, MiG-21, MiG-23 and Su-22 jet combat aircraft during its existence. In the 1980s it had three fighter regiments (wings) at the three main bases with three squadrons each, with a total of approximately 100 active supersonic fighter aircraft. From 1989 the force was downsized several times until the early 2000s when only one active fighter squadron was remaining with often only 2-4 flyable alert ready aircraft at a given time.

In mid-1993, three batches of 28 MiG-29s were delivered from Russia as a payment in kind of government debt. They were based at Kecskemét. In 1995, a German gift of 20 Mi-24D/V's arrived.

For most other former Warsaw Pact member countries, pilot training was not a big deal. Each nation maintained an independent aviation technical college, an academy for training military aircraft pilots, and technical personnel. After the Second World War, Hungary created György Kilián Aviation Technical College in 1949, but in the 1960s domestic pilot training was discontinued and the 18 then modern Aero L-29 Delfin jet trainers were handed over to the Soviet Union. The training of pilots was conducted in several schools and bases in the USSR in the following years, and also in Czechoslovakia, in Košice. In Hungary, only helicopter pilots and technicians were trained at Szolnok.

In 1993, Hungary commenced its first pilot training course since 1956 at the Szolnok Aviation Academy. For this, 12 Yak-52 primary trainers were purchased from Romania. The German Government also donated 24 Aero L-39 Albatros jet trainers. The cost of domestic pilot training was later deemed too high after a change of government, and was halted after the completion of only one course. Also in 1997 the MIG-23s and Su-22s were withdrawn from service, the later type was retired just after an overhaul. During the 1990s all combat aircraft were fitted with new Identification Friend or Foe (IFF) systems to enable operations in Western airspace. In April 2002, Hungary joined the NATO Flying Training in Canada (NFTC) pilot training program.

Shortly after Hungary joined NATO in 1999, a push was made to replace the Air Force's MiG-29 fleet with a NATO-compatible fighter force. By 2001, several offers had been received, a Swedish offer with 24 JAS39C/D, the USA offered 24 used F-16's and multiple other offers had been received for the commissioning of various used aircraft. Despite the fact that the professional committees favored the F-16, on September 10, 2001, the Swedish bid won, and on December 20 Hungary signed a contract with the Swedish Government. The contract included leasing 14 JAS 39 Gripens, two of which are two-seaters, for 12 years beginning in 2006 (later extended until 2026). By December 2007 all 14 jets had been delivered. After the lease period expires in 2026, Hungary will own the remaining Gripens.

A large-scale modernization program was launched in 2016 under the name "Zrinyi 2026". Its first significant step was the order of 36 Airbus helicopters in 2018. 20 H145M was ordered for light utility, SAR, and light attack roles. Later that year 16 H225M helicopters were ordered for heavy transport and SOF roles. All 20 H145Ms were delivered by the end of 2021.

In June 2020, the last plane from the Antonov An-26 fleet was retired from service, temporarily leaving the Hungarian Air Force without tactical airlift capability. Two KC-390 were ordered to fill this role in late 2020. The first aircraft is to arrive in 2023, the second in 2024.

The ground-based air defence arm also got a big boost in 2020 by ordering of the NASAMS missile system and the 11 ELM-2084 radars. The Mistral short range air defence system was also modernized.

As part of modernization program, Hungarian Air Force also interested to obtain new advanced training aircraft. Hungarian Air Force perform evaluation flights of L-39NG during Aero Vodochody visit on 17 November 2021. In April 2022, Hungarian official and Aero announced that Hungary have signed agreement to purchase 12 L-39NGs and expected to be arrived in 2024.

In August 2021 an upgrade contract was signed with SAAB to modernize the Gripen fleet which would include an improved PS-05/A Mk4 radar and new armament. After implementing the MS20 Block 2 software upgrade, the Hungarian Gripens would be able to launch Meteor, IRIS-T missiles, and GBU-49 bombs. All of these weapons are under procurement as of 2022.

The Hungarian Air Force plans to keep its upgraded Gripen fleet well into the 2030s and even acquire enough fighters for a second fighter squadron. 5th generation aircraft like the F-35 are too expensive, and their advanced capabilities are not necessary for the defense needs of Hungary. Airstrike capability (where stealth has a great advantage) is not a priority for the Hungarian Air Force, and no potential foe has stealth fighters in the region. Most likely, the Hungarian Air Force will skip on the 5th generation of fighter aircraft and plans to participate in one of the European fighter development projects in one way or another.

Structure 

The following units are part of the Hungarian Air Force, but like all other operational units of the Hungarian Defense Forces they fall under operational control of the Hungarian Defense Forces Command in Székesfehérvár

 Hungarian Defense Forces Command, in Székesfehérvár
 Air Command and Control Centre, in Veszprém
 Air Operations Centre
 Control and Reporting Centre
 Training and Reserve Control Centre, at Kecskemét Air Base
 Military Air Traffic Management Centre
 Meteorological Centre
 Simulation and Exercise Centre
 12th Air Defense Missile Regiment "Arrabona", in Győr
 1st Air Defense Missile Battalion, with 2K12 Kub mobile SAM systems
 2nd Air Defense Missile Battalion, with Mistral SAM systems
 Command and Control Battalion
 Logistic Battalion
 Training Company
 54th Radar Regiment "Veszprém", in Veszprém
 Command Company
 1st Radar Data Centre, in Békéscsaba, with RAT-31DL
 2nd Radar Data Centre, in Medina, with RAT-31DL
 3rd Radar Data Centre, in Bánkút, with RAT-31DL
 11th Radar Company, in Kup
 12th Radar Company, in Juta
 21st Radar Company, in Debrecen
 22nd Radar Company, in Békéscsaba
 Gap Filling Radar Company, in Medina
 59th Air Base "Dezső Szentgyörgyi", at Kecskemét Air Base
 Base Operations Center
 Tactical Fighter Squadron "Puma", with 14x JAS-39C/D Gripen
 Airlift Squadron "Teve", with 2x Airbus A319, 2x Dassault Falcon 7X
 Operations Support Battalion
 Maintenance Battalion
 Logistic Battalion
 86th Helicopter Base "Szolnok", at Szolnok Air Base
 Base Operations Center 
 Attack Helicopter Battalion "Phoenix", with 2x Mi-24V, 6x Mi-24P
 Mixed Training Squadron, with 2x H125, 6x Z-242, 2x Z-143
 Operations Support Battalion
 Maintenance Battalion
 Logistic Battalion
 Pápa Air Base 
 Base Operations Center
 Heavy Airlift Wing (NATO Strategic Airlift Capability), with 3x C-17 Globemaster III
 Operations Support Battalion
 Logistic Battalion 
 Information Protection Group

The Hungarian Air Force Aircraft Repair Facility at Kecskemét Air Base falls under the Hungarian Defense Forces Logistics Center in Budapest.

59th Air Base "Dezső Szentgyörgyi" 

The 59th Air Base is the home to fixed-winged aircraft of the Air Force. The 59th consists of one tactical fighter squadron and one airlift squadron.

The airlift squadron, nicknamed "Teve" operates the air force's transport aircraft, while the Fighter Squadron is nicknamed "Puma" and operates JAS-39C/D Gripen fighters.  On 19 May 2015 one two-seater Saab JAS39D Gripen crashed at the end of the runway at the Čáslav AFB. The pilots ejected safely, but the aircraft, nr. 42 with callsign PUMA66 was written off, damaged beyond repair. A replacement Gripen D was delivered from Sweden in 2016. On 10 June 2015, a single-seater JAS 39C, nr. 30, performed a belly landing at Kecskemét Air Base, Hungary. The pilot, Major Sándor Kádár, ejected successfully, but suffered spinal injuries.

86th Helicopter Base "Szolnok" 
The 86th Base is the home of the air force's helicopters. The 86th consists of one transport and one attack helicopter battalion and the base also houses a mixed training company.

The transport helicopter battalion of the 86th Wing operates H145M's.
The Phoenix battalion operates Mi-24V/P attack helicopters.
The Training Squadron operates Z-242L trainers and H125 helicopters.

12th Air Defense Missile Regiment 
The 12th Air Defense Missile Regiment is in charge of providing air defense to Hungary and fields:
 2K12 Kub mobile Surface-to-air missile (SAM) systems. (To be replaced entirely with NASAMS by 2025)
 Mistral lightweight SAM systems mounted on Unimog all-terrain vehicles
 36D6 modernized, all-altitude surveillance radars, with domestically developed digital electronics suite.

On 11 November 2020, the Hungarian Government announced that it purchased the NASAMS medium to long range air-defence system. It is scheduled to arrive in 2023.

Pápa AFB 
Pápa Air Force Base was established as a military organization on 1 July 2001 as a part of Hungary's commitments to NATO's Infrastructural Development Program, and it is the legal successor of the HDF 47th Pápa Tactical Fighter Regiment.

Current inventory 

 

NOTE: Three C-17 Globemaster III’s are stationed at Pápa Air Base in Hungary to support NATO’s Strategic Airlift Capability operations.

Aircraft armament 

Meteor missiles and GBU-49 guided bombs are planned to be purchased for the Gripen fleet.

Air defense assets

Aircraft markings 
The Hungarian aircraft marking is a set of aligned triangles which points toward the front of the aircraft. They are the same colour as the Hungarian flag, red, white, and green. The innermost triangle is green, follow by white, and then red. It is displayed on the side of helicopters and in the standard four wing positions on aircraft. It was used by the Royal Hungarian Air Force until 1942, and then reinstated after the Second World War. The new Gripen fighters wear a NATO standard compliant grey-on-grey (low-visibility) version of the Hungarian triangle insignia.

Ranks and insignia

References

Bibliography
Dorschener, Jim. "Hungary's Fleet Revolution". Air International, Vol. 86, No. 2. February 2014. pp. 72–75. ISSN 0306-5634.

Further reading 
World Air Power Journal No.3 p. 150
World Air Power Journal No.14 p. 148
Air Forces Monthly June 1997

External links 
 
 
 
 
 
 

Military of Hungary
Air forces by country
Aviation in Hungary